LIS or LiS may refer to:

Computing
 LIS (programming language)
 Lis (linear algebra library), library of iterative solvers for linear systems
 Laboratory information system, databases oriented towards medical laboratories
 Land information system, land mapping and cadastre GIS used by local governments
 Language-independent specification, a programming language specification
 Legume Information System, online resources and exploratory tools for legume researchers and breeders
 Linear Integrated Systems, American manufacturer of semiconductors
 Local information systems, collect, store, and disseminate information about small geographic areas
 Location information server, provides location information
 Longest increasing subsequence, algorithm to find the longest increasing subsequence in an array of numbers

Science
 Laser Isotope Separation, a means of producing enriched uranium from uranium ore
 Lateral internal sphincterotomy, an operation for the treatment of chronic anal fissure
 Lightning Imaging Sensor, an instrument on the TRMM satellite and on the International Space Station
 Liquid-impregnated surface
 Locked-in syndrome, a type of paralysis
 Library and information science

Other 
 Lis (given name)
 Lis (surname)
 Lis River, a river in Portugal
 Lis coat of arms, of Polish Clan Lis
 Lis, Albania, in the Mat municipality of Dibër County
 Italian Sign Language (Lingua dei Segni Italiana)
 Life Is Strange (series), a series of episodic graphic adventure games.
 Life Is Strange (2015 video game)
 Lithium-sulphur battery (Li-S)
 Locate in Scotland (1981–2001), replaced by Scottish Development International
 London Interdisciplinary School, alternative university in England
 Lisbon Airport, Portugal, IATA code